XHDCH-FM is a radio station on 95.3 FM in Delicias, Chihuahua, Mexico. The station is owned by Sigma Radio and known as La Ke Buena with a grupera format.

History
XHDCH began as XEDCH-AM 1540, quickly moved to 1180. It received its concession on October 28, 1994 and was owned by Radiorama. In 2005, the station was sold to Emisora de Delicias, which is mostly owned by José Luis Chavero Resendiz.

It migrated to FM in 2011.

References

Radio stations in Chihuahua